Hobie Cat is a company that manufactures sailing catamarans, surfboards, sailboats, kayaks, stand-up paddle boards, and pedalboards as the Hobie Cat Company. It was founded in 1961 by Hobart Alter, who originally manufactured surfboards. Its line of products has included more than twenty sailing craft, plus a variety of other watercraft.

History
Hobie Cat was founded by Hobart Alter. Initially a surfboard manufacturer in the late 1950s, in 1961 Alter's focus changed to designing an easily beached fiberglass catamaran.

The impetus of this shift is attributed to a 1961 boat show in Anaheim, California, where Alter sold surfboards adjacent to the designer of the 1961 Aqua Cat 12 sailboat, which featured lightweight fiberglass hulls with an aluminium tube structure supporting a trampoline style deck for seating. Following the 1961 boat show, Alter contacted Arthur "Art" Javes to tell him he was also entering the fledgling catamaran market. The first production Hobie Cat was launched on July 4, 1968 and featured a structure similar to the AQUA CAT, but slightly heavier with asymmetrically-shaped hulls that did not rely on dagger boards. This design was more readily beached than the AQUA CAT or Pacific Cat.

In 1969, Hobie released the Hobie 16, their most popular catamaran and the world's largest one-design catamaran class. Over 135,000 Hobie 16 Cats have been built. This was followed by many other similar beachcats: the Hobie 18 in 1976, the Hobie 17 in 1985, the Hobie 21 in 1987, the Hobie 18SX in 1989, the Hobie 17 Sport in 1990, the Hobie 20 in 1991, and the Hobie 21 Sport Cruiser in 1992.

In 1996 Hobie introduced the Pursuit kayak, the first of a new generation of boats built using rotomolded polyethylene.  This production method is less expensive and time consuming than the fiberglass molds used in the original series of catamarans, and results in a very strong and durable hull, but one which is not as smooth or light as those produced using fiberglass. After perfecting the rotomolded technique on a series small kayaks the company offered their first rotomolded catamaran, the Hobie Wave in 1994. The largest of the rotomolded catamarans, the Hobie Getaway was launched in 2000, then the smallest, the Hobie Bravo was launched in 2001.

Current and notable past sailboat models

Units built - information from International Sailing Federation (now Word Sailing) Class Reports of 2012:

Hobie 14 46,000

Hobie 16 135,000

Hobie 18 18,000

Hobie Dragoon 800

Hobie Tiger 1,100

Hobie Wildcat 332

Hobie Dragoon
The Hobie Dragoon was designed by Hobie Cat Europe as a youth trainer for racing. Age target was 12 to 14 years. Double trapeze and spinnaker option to introduce young sailors to high performance. Length: , Beam: , Mast Length: , Sail Area: . Main plus Jib, Weight: . D-PN: 83.0

Hobie 10
The Hobie 10 was a small dinghy produced as a response to the Laser dinghy. It has been discontinued.

Hobie 14
The Hobie 14 was the original catamaran designed by Hobie Alter. The general shape and design of the boat is very similar to the later Hobie 16. They share many of the same parts. The 14 was originally designed to be sailed from the beach through the surf and back. It's a unirig with just a main sail. It is possible to convert a standard 14 into a Hobie 14 "Turbo", also known as the JT14, or H14T by adding a jib, trapeze and dolphin striker. No longer manufactured by Hobie North America, the Hobie 14 is still produced in limited numbers by Hobie Europe and Hobie Brazil.

The Hobie 14 is known for its forward mast and very bent banana shaped hull. The forward mast and odd shaped hulls make the boat quite sensitive to weight placement fore and aft. If the helm sits too far forward, he or she can cause the leeward bow to dig in, resulting in a pitchpole.

The Hobie 14 has a D-PN of 86.4 with the Turbo version faster at 83.1.

Hobie 16

The Hobie 16 is the most popular Hobie Cat, both for recreational and racing purposes and as a one-design racer. As with the 14, it is intended to be sailed from the beach through the surf, and to be surfed back in on the waves to the beach. Instead of daggerboards or centreboards, the 16 has asymmetrical hulls which act like foils and keep the boat from crabbing, or slipping sideways from the force of the wind. Both jib and main sails are fully battened and total . A trapeze is usually used by the crew and helmsman.

Hobie 17

The Hobie 17 was available in two 'trim packages': the Sport has a jib and a small boomlett that is not attached to the mast and is intended for recreational use by two people, while the SE has only the main sail, a full boom, and is designed to be raced by one person. Both models have swinging centreboards and 'wings', which are made of aluminium tubing that plug into the hulls and covered with reinforced vinyl or mesh covers that can be used as seats, backrests, or provide more leverage when trapezing. The uni-rig or catboat sail plan allows the 17SE to 'point' well, or sail closer to straight upwind than many other sloop-rigged catamarans. As of 2003 this boat is no longer produced.

The Hobie 17 has a Portsmouth Number of 783. The SE version has a D-PN of 74.0 and the Sport version has 74.5.

FX-One
The FX-One is an import from the France-based Hobie Cat Europe company. Successor of the 17, this boat is designed both for single-handed racing (mainsail + gennaker) and dual-crew sailing (jib + mainsail + gennaker). In both configurations, this boat is eligible for the IHCA racing class. In the two-sailor configuration, this boat is also eligible for the Class 104 multihull class. It features wavepiercing hulls, and daggerboards. The D-PN is listed as 70.1 without spinnaker and 68.5 singlehanded with spinnaker.

Hobie 18

The Hobie Class Association consider the Hobie 18 the most versatile of all the Hobie beachcats. The Hobie 18 was designed to be not only fast but also rugged. It is designed to be sailed by a crew of two, but can easily carry four passengers when cruising. Experienced sailors can sail the Hobie 18 solo. Unlike the smaller Hobie 14 and 16, the Hobie 18 uses a symmetrical hull design. Although this design gives the 18 a speed advantage, it requires the use of daggerboards when sailing close-hauled or reaching to prevent slipping. The typical configuration for the Hobie 18 is with both a main sail and a jib. The jib on the 18 is set up on a rolling/furling system that wraps the jib around the forestay when it isn't needed. A double trapeze system is also standard equipment on the Hobie 18. Optionally the Hobie 18 may be equipped with wing seats (similar to the 17). Wings were available on the Hobie 18 in two fashions. The shorter wing "spanned" from the front to rear crossbar on the Hobie 18 Magnum, while the Hobie 18SX sported even longer wings. These wings reached aft to the stern and forward approximately  ahead of the front crossbar. Additionally, the SX model had a mast approximately  taller and high aspect mylar sails. Wings of both types, magnum and SX, are in much demand today due to the added comfort and space provided. Much to the dismay of many Hobie enthusiasts, the Hobie 18 is currently no longer produced.

Hobie Tiger

The Hobie Tiger, another Hobie Cat Europe import, is Hobie Cat's entry into the Formula 18 multihull class. The Tiger has been very popular and successful both in class racing and Formula 18. The class D-PN is 62.1.

Hobie Pacific
The Hobie Pacific is based on the Hobie Tiger, but has skegs instead of daggerboards, a smaller rig, and no boom. The boat is intended to be easier to handle than a F18 boat, and targeted at sailing schools.

Hobie Wildcat
The Hobie Wildcat was introduced in 2009. Same as the Tiger, it is a Formula 18 boat and has the same measurements, weight, and sail area.
The boat is optimized for racing, with wave-piercing bows, a flat bottom in the stern for better planing, and thin daggerboards.

Miracle 20
In contrast to the Tiger, the Miracle 20 has  of sail area and takes advantage of light winds. Some of the early production models had a high rate of hull failures due to a manufacturing defect, but this was rectified in later models. As of June 2007 this model is no longer in production. The Miracle 20 is designed by Jack Groeneveld, a Dutch catamaran sailor (European champion Prindle 19, winner of the Prindle 19 nationals etc.)

Hobie Fox
The Hobie Fox was designed by Hobie Cat Europe to meet the Formula 20 racing class rules. The hull shape was designed by world champion A-Class sailor Nils Bunkenberg. It is a modern wave-piercing hull. It has a double trapeze, asymmetrical spinnaker with snuffer retrieval system, high performance daggerboards, race rudders, and sails designed by Giorgio Zuccoli. With a D-PN of 60.4, the Fox is the fastest of the Hobie family.

Hobie 21SC
The 21SC (for Sport Cruiser) was Hobie Cat's first 'family boat'. Intended for casual sailing, this boat has a front trampoline, wings, an outboard motor-mount, and a built-in cooler. The 21SC was quickly displaced by the more rugged, cheaper Getaway and has been phased out by Hobie Cat.

Hobie 21SE
The 21SE hulls are similar to the 21SC but the similarities end there, the 21SE is a performance oriented boat. The boat was intended for a racing crew of two or three adults. It weighs  and has a D-PN of 67.0. It had arched, curved crossbars. It was raced as a one design boat in professional racing circuits. The boat is fast and stable but probably saw low production numbers because of its weight, the need to telescope the hulls for trailering and because it is difficult to right the boat if it capsizes without outside assistance.

TriFoiler
The TriFoiler was one of the fastest production sailboats ever created. It was based on a series of boats designed by Greg and Dan Ketterman and sailed by Russel Long, which eventually culminated in Long setting the A-Class Catamaran world sailing speed record in 1992 in the boat "Longshot". That record remains unbroken. The TriFoiler is based on Longshot and this sailing hydrofoil stands as the most unusual of Hobie Cat's boats.

It was the largest multihull boat built by Hobie Cat, with 170 produced between 1995 and 1999; another 30 were built independently prior to production starting at Hobie Cat.

Hobie 33
The Hobie 33 is a  monohull lift-keel boat designed to be very light and very fast. It is considered a ULDB or ultralight displacement boat, a sportsboat. It was intended to be a trailerable, one design racer/cruiser. To be trailerable in all US states without special overwidth road permits, beam was kept to just , which is quite narrow for a boat of this length, although the Hobie 33 was advertised as being capable of sleeping 7 people. A total of 187 Hobie 33s were built between 1982 and 1986.

The design was the brainchild of Hobie Alter and Sheldon Coleman Sr. To start the project a Bill Lee designed ULDB Santa Cruz 27 named "Redline" was purchased, analyzed and then raced in southern California. Once the design stage started Lewie and John Wake were brought in to lend racing yacht design experience. Hobie 18 designer and legendary surfer Phil Edwards designed the keel and rudder.

There is an active North American class association and national championships yearly. In 2005, the Hobie 33 was first in the doublehanded division of Transpacific Yacht Race and went on to win its class against fully crewed boats.

Rotomolded boats

This series of boats is created of rotomolded plastic and is intended for casual and new sailors.

These can be split into two main categories, Hobie Cat USA rotomolded boats and Hobie Cat Europe rotomoulded boats. The boats from the US include the Bravo, Wave and Getaway, whilst the European range consists of the Catsy, Teddy, Twixxy, Max and Tattoo.

The relatively narrow beam compared to its  mast leads to considerable heeling, or tipping of the boat compared to other catamarans. The Bravo has the distinction of being able to furl its sail around the mast. The D-PN is 100.0.

The Hobie Wave is intended for one to four passengers, but is easily handled by one with its  length,  beam, and  mast. The Wave was designed by the Morelli/Melvin Engineering firm, and has proved to be extremely popular with beach resorts and rental operations. It is often praised for being rugged and easy to sail. While described as slow and underpowered by catamaran standards, it has a D-PN of 92.1, similar to a Laser (dinghy) that is often considered to be a performance dinghy. Although marketed as a recreational sailboat, an owner-controlled racing class has organized and held regattas since 1998.

The Hobie Getaway is marketed as a "social boat" and is designed with room for up to 6 people, more than Hobie Cat's other boats. The boat has a trampoline both forward and aft of the mast, and is the only rotomolded Hobie to come stock with a jib and have an available trapeze. It has a D-PN of 83.3.

Racing
Racing of Hobie catamarans is completed in a large number of countries around the world. The most popular class is the Hobie 16 which has large fleets sailing in Europe, North America, Australia, Asia, South America and in the islands of Oceania such as New Caledonia and Fiji. The racing is a mix of recreational and competitive with several classes holding regular national, regional and world championships.

See also
 List of multihulls
 Hobart "Hobie" Alter founder and creator of the Hobie Cat
 List of sailboat designers and manufacturers

References

Footnotes

Endnotes

External links

 Hobie Cat Company - web site
 Hobie Cat sailing models
 Hobie Class of North America
 International Hobie Class
 International Wave Class Association
 BHCCA – British Hobie Cat Class Association

Hobie Cat
Catamarans